This is a list of plants by common name that are native to the U.S. state of Oregon.

Adobe parsley
Alaska blueberry
American wild carrot
Austin's popcornflower
Awned melic
Azalea
Azure penstemon
Baby blue eyes
Baldhip rose
Beach strawberry
Beach wormwood
Bearded lupine
Bensoniella
Bigleaf maple
Bigleaf sedge
Birdnest buckwheat
Birthroot, western trillium
Bitter cherry
Bleeding heart
Blow-wives
Blue elderberry
Bog Labrador tea
Bolander's lily
Bridges' cliffbreak
Brook wakerobin
Brown dogwood
Buckbrush
Bugle hedgenettle
Bunchberry
California broomrape
California buttercup
California canarygrass
California goldfields
California milkwort
California phacelia
California stoneseed
California wild rose
Camas
Canary violet
Canyon gooseberry
Cascara
Castle Lake bedstraw
Charming centaury
Chinese caps
Citrus fawn lily
Coastal cryptantha
Coastal sand-verbena
Coastal sneezeweed
Coastal woodfern
Cobra lily
Cobwebby thistle
Cook's lomatium
Common agrimony
Common star lily
Copperbush
Creamcups
Cream stonecrop
Crimson columbine
Crown brodiaea
Cusick's giant hyssop
Cusick's stickweed
Daggerpod
Davy mannagrass
Deer fern
Del Norte pea
Desert Indian paintbrush
Douglas-fir
Douglas iris
Douglas' silverpuffs
Douglas' stitchwort
Douglas' violet
Downy pincushionplant
Dusky onion
Dutchman's breeches
Dwarf ceanothus
Dwarf Oregon-grape
Eelgrass
Elegant brodiaea
Engelmann spruce
English sundew
Evergreen huckleberry
False lily-of-the-valley
False Solomon seal
Firecracker flower
Forest clover
Frigid shooting star
Fringecup
Gambel's dwarf milkvetch
Giant blazingstar
Giant chain fern
Giant purple wakerobin
Glandular yellow phacelia
Goldeneggs
Goldenfleece
Golden inside-out flower
Gorman's buttercup
Grand fir
Gray chickensage
Gray's biscuitroot
Gray's catchfly
Grants Pass willowherb
Grasswidows
Greene's popcornflower
Ground rose
Grouseberry
Hardhack, Douglas' spirea
Hasse's vetch
Henderson's angelica
Hollyleaf pincushionplant
Horsetail, scouring rush horsetail
Howell's saxifrage
Huckleberry oak
Hupa gooseberry
Idaho trillium, round leaf trillium
Incense-cedar mistletoe
Indian celery
Indian pipe
Indian warrior
Jaumea
Jaynes Canyon buckwheat
Juniper
Juniper mistletoe
Kalmiopsis
Kellogg's monkeyflower
Kellogg's umbrellawort
Kincaid's lupine
Kinnikinnick
Klamath fawn lily
Klamath sedge
Lady fern
Leafy fleabane
Leiberg's clover
Lewis' mock-orange
Licorice fern
Little false Solomon seal
MacFarlane's four-o'clock
Madrone
Maidenhair fern
Malheur wirelettuce
Manzanita
Mapleleaf checkerbloom
Marigold pincushionplant
Marsh violet
Mendocino gentian
Miner's lettuce
Mojave pincushion
Mountain pride
Naked mariposa lily
Nakedsteam phacelia
Narrowpetal wakerobin
Nevada bluegrass
Nevada lupine
Nootka reedgrass
Nootka rose
North Umpqua kalmiopsis
Notchleaf clover
Ocean spray
Orange honeysuckle
Oregon false goldenaster
Oregon iris
Oregon-grape
Oregon manroot
Oregon mock-orange 
Oregon myrtle
Oregon oxalis
Oregon western rosinweed
Oregon white oak
Osoberry, Indian plum
Pacific coralroot
Pacific ninebark
Pacific rhododendron
Paper birch
Parish's nightshade
Piggyback plant
Pinemat manzanita
Pink honeysuckle
Pink spineflower
Pinto violet
Playa phacelia
Poison oak
Lemon balm
Ponderosa pine
Port Orford cedar
Prettyface
Prostrate buckwheat
Pygmy rose
Radishroot woodsorrel
Rayless ragwort
Red alder 
Red clintonia
Red flowering currant
Red huckleberry
Redwood pea
Roseflower stonecrop
Red osier dogwood
Ribbed fringepod
Round-leaved sundew
Royal rein orchid
Rusty popcornflower
Sagebrush
Salal
Salmonberry
Salmon polemonium
Sanborn's onion
San Diego raspberry
Serpentine arnica
Serviceberry
Shadscale
Shaggy hawkweed
Shasta knotweed
Sheldon's sedge
Shieldleaf
Shore pine
Shorthair reedgrass
Short-podded thelypody
Sierra gooseberry
Sierra willow
Silky horkelia
Silver lupine
Silver sagebrush
Siskiyou bluecurls
Siskiyou false hellebore
Siskiyou fleabane
Siskiyou fritillary
Siskiyou lewisia
Siskiyou mariposa lily
Snowberry
Snow plant
Splithair Indian paintbrush
Spring draba
Spurry buckwheat
Stemless dwarf cudweed
Sticky currant
Sticky monkeyflower
Stingining phacelia
Swamp rose
Sword fern
Thimbleberry
Torrey's blue-eyed Mary
Trailing blackberry
Trailing gooseberry
Tricolor monkeyflower
Tuni
Twinberry honeysuckle
Twinleaf onion
Umpqua mariposa lily
Valley tassels
Veatch's blazingstar
Vine maple
Washington lily
Waterleaf
Water pennywort
Western fringed catchfly
Western goblin
Western hemlock
Western lily
Western juniper
Western red cedar
Western water hemlock
Western white pine dwarf mistletoe
Western yellow woodsorrel
Whitestem gooseberry
Wild crab apple
Wild ginger
Willamette daisy
Woolly meadowfoam
Woollypod milkvetch
Yellow lady's slipper

See also 
Lists of Oregon-related topics
List of Oregon birds

General reference

Native and Naturalized Plants of Oregon

External links
Native Plants of the Northwest

 01
 
.